George V (1865–1936) was king of the United Kingdom and its dominions from 1910 to 1936.

George V or King George V may also refer to:

People
 George V of Georgia (c. 1286 – 1346)
 George V of Imereti, King of Imereti (western Georgia) from 1696 to 1698
 George V of Hanover (1819–1878), last king of Hanover
 George V of Armenia (1847–1930), catholicos of the Armenian church

Docks
 King George V Dock, Glasgow
 King George V Dock, London
 King George V Dock, Hull

Places
 George V Coast, Antarctica
 King George V Park, Newfoundland, Canada
 King George V Memorial Park, Hong Kong

Rail
 LNWR George the Fifth Class
 GWR no. 6000 King George V
 George V (Paris Métro), Paris, France
 King George V DLR station, London, UK

Schools and colleges
 SMK King George V, Malaysia
 King George V College, UK

Ships
 HMS King George V (1911), a battleship
 King George V-class battleship (1911)
 HMS King George V (41), a battleship
 King George V-class battleship (1939)
 TS King George V, a turbine steamer

Other uses
 King George V Memorial Hospital, a hospital in New South Wales, Australia
 Hotel George V, Paris, a hotel in France

See also
 HMS Monarch, a list of ships
 King George (disambiguation)
 King George School (disambiguation)
 King George V School (disambiguation)
 King George Square, Brisbane, Australia
 King George Stakes, a UK horse race
 King George Street (disambiguation)
 KGV (disambiguation)
 KGV Oval, Tasmania, Australia
 George Tupou V (1948–2012), King of Tonga from 2006 to 2012